The 2020–21 Memphis Grizzlies season was the 26th season of the franchise in the National Basketball Association (NBA) and 20th in Memphis. The Grizzlies qualified for the playoffs for the first time since the 2016–17 season following a victory over the Golden State Warriors in the play-in tournament. However, they lost to the Utah Jazz in five games.

Draft

Roster

Standings

Division

Conference

Notes
 z – Clinched home court advantage for the entire playoffs
 c – Clinched home court advantage for the conference playoffs
 y – Clinched division title
 x – Clinched playoff spot
 pb – Clinched play-in spot
 o – Eliminated from playoff contention
 * – Division leader

Game log

Preseason

|-style="background:#cfc;"
| 1
| December 12
| @ Minnesota
| 
| Ja Morant (20)
| Jonas Valančiūnas (9)
| Ja Morant (11)
| Target Center0
| 1–0
|-style="background:#cfc;"
| 2
| December 14
| @ Minnesota
| 
| Jonas Valančiūnas (22)
| Kyle Anderson (8)
| Ja Morant (7)
| Target Center0
| 2–0
|-style="background:#cfc;"
| 3
| December 17
| Atlanta
| 
| Dillon Brooks (24)
| Jonas Valančiūnas (13)
| Ja Morant (13)
| FedEx Forum0
| 3–0
|-style="background:#fcc;"
| 4
| December 19
| Atlanta
| 
| Ja Morant (15)
| Jonas Valančiūnas (9)
| Ja Morant (8)
| FedEx Forum0
| 3–1

Regular season

|-style="background:#fcc;"
| 1
| December 23
| San Antonio
| 
| Ja Morant (44)
| Jonas Valančiūnas (13)
| Ja Morant (9)
| FedEx Forum0
| 0–1
|-style="background:#fcc;"
| 2
| December 26
| Atlanta
| 
| Ja Morant (28)
| Kyle Anderson (14)
| Ja Morant (7)
| FedEx Forum0
| 0–2
|-style="background:#cfc;"
| 3
| December  28
| @ Brooklyn
| 
| Kyle Anderson (28)
| Jonas Valančiūnas (14)
| Dillon Brooks (4)
| Barclays Center0
| 1–2
|-style="background:#fcc;"
| 4
| December 30
| @ Boston
| 
| Jonas Valančiūnas (20)
| Jonas Valančiūnas (11)
| Kyle Anderson (9)
| TD Garden0
| 1–3

|-style="background:#cfc;"
| 5
| January 1
| @ Charlotte
| 
| Dillon Brooks (21)
| Tyus Jones (12)
| Kyle Anderson (11)
| Spectrum Center0
| 2–3
|-style="background:#fcc;"
| 6
| January 3
| L.A. Lakers
| 
| Kyle Anderson (18)
| Jonas Valančiūnas (10)
| Dillon Brooks (5) 
| FedEx Forum0
| 2–4
|-style="background:#fcc;"
| 7
| January 5
| L.A. Lakers
| 
| Brooks, Dieng, Valančiūnas (13)
| Jonas Valančiūnas (11)
| Tyus Jones (8)
| FedEx Forum0
| 2–5
|-style="background:#fcc;"
| 8
| January 7
| Cleveland
| 
| Jonas Valančiūnas (17)
| Jonas Valančiūnas (10)
| Tyus Jones (6)
| FedEx Forum0
| 2–6
|-style="background:#cfc;"
| 9
| January 8
| Brooklyn
| 
| Dillon Brooks (24)
| Brandon Clarke (8)
| Tyus Jones (10)
| FedEx Forum0
| 3–6
|-style="background:#cfc;"
| 10
| January 11
| @ Cleveland
| 
| Dillon Brooks (21)
| Brooks, Valančiūnas (7)
| Kyle Anderson (9)
| Rocket Mortgage FieldHouse0
| 4–6
|-style="background:#cfc;"
| 11
| January 13
| @ Minnesota
| 
| Jonas Valančiūnas (24)
| Jonas Valančiūnas (16)
| Tyus Jones (7)
| Target Center0
| 5–6
|-style="background:#ccc;"
| –
| January 15
| @ Minnesota
| colspan="6" | Postponed (COVID-19) (Makeup date: May 5)
|-style="background:#cfc;"
| 12
| January 16
| Philadelphia
| 
| Ja Morant (17)
| Brandon Clarke (11)
| Ja Morant (6)
| FedEx Forum0
| 6–6
|-style="background:#cfc;"
| 13
| January 18
| Phoenix
| 
| Clarke, Morant (17)
| Kyle Anderson (8)
| Ja Morant (10)
| FedEx Forum0
| 7–6
|-style="background:#ccc;"
| –
| January 20
| @ Portland
| colspan="6" | Postponed (COVID-19) (Makeup date: April 23)
|-style="background:#ccc;"
| –
| January 22
| @ Portland
| colspan="6" | Postponed (COVID-19) (Makeup date: April 25)
|-style="background:#ccc;"
| –
| January 24
| Sacramento
| colspan="6" | Postponed (COVID-19) (Makeup date: May 13)
|-style="background:#ccc;"
| –
| January 25
| Sacramento
| colspan="6" | Postponed (COVID-19) (Makeup date: May 14)
|-style="background:#ccc;"
| –
| January 27
| Chicago
| colspan="6" | Postponed (COVID-19) (Makeup date: April 12)
|-style="background:#cfc;"
| 14
| January 30
| @ San Antonio
| 
| De'Anthony Melton (20)
| Dieng, Konchar (7)
| Ja Morant (11)
| AT&T Center0
| 8–6

|-style="background:#cfc;"
| 15
| February 1
| @ San Antonio
| 
| Gorgui Dieng (19)
| Dieng, Tillman (9)
| Tyus Jones (14)
| AT&T Center0
| 9–6
|-style="background:#fcc;"
| 16
| February 2
| @ Indiana 
| 
| Dillon Brooks (25)
| Dieng, Konchar (6)
| De'Anthony Melton (6)
| Bankers Life Fieldhouse0
| 9–7
|-style="background:#fcc;"
| 17
| February 4
| Houston
| 
| Desmond Bane (16)
| Xavier Tillman (10)
| Tyus Jones (8)
| FedEx Forum0
| 9–8
|-style="background:#fcc;"
| 18
| February 6
| @ New Orleans
| 
| Jonas Valančiūnas (23)
| Xavier Tillman (8)
| Ja Morant (9)
| Smoothie King Center1,440
| 9–9
|-style="background:#fcc;"
| 19
| February 8
| Toronto
| 
| Jonas Valančiūnas (27)
| Jonas Valančiūnas (20)
| Ja Morant (9)
| FedEx Forum1,844
| 9–10
|-style="background:#cfc;"
| 20
| February 10
| Charlotte
| 
| Kyle Anderson (27)
| Jonas Valančiūnas (15)
| Ja Morant (11)
| FedEx Forum1,830
| 10–10
|-style="background:#fcc;"
| 21
| February 12
| @ L. A. Lakers
| 
| Grayson Allen (23)
| Jonas Valančiūnas (8)
| Ja Morant (10)
| Staples Center0
| 10–11
|-style="background:#cfc;"
| 22
| February 14
| @ Sacramento
| 
| Jonas Valančiūnas (25)
| Jonas Valančiūnas (13)
| Ja Morant (10)
| Golden 1 Center0
| 11–11
|-style="background:#fcc;"
| 23
| February 16
| New Orleans
| 
| Ja Morant (28)
| Ja Morant (7)
| Ja Morant (8)
| FedEx Forum1,982
| 11–12
|-style="background:#cfc;"
| 24
| February 17
| Oklahoma City
| 
| Allen, Valančiūnas (22)
| Jonas Valančiūnas (12)
| Ja Morant (12)
| FedEx Forum0
| 12–12
|-style="background:#cfc;"
| 25
| February 19
| Detroit
| 
| Ja Morant (29)
| Jonas Valančiūnas (15)
| Grayson Allen (6)
| FedEx Forum1,795
| 13–12
|-style="background:#fcc;"
| 26
| February 20
| Phoenix
| 
| Gorgui Dieng (15)
| Jonas Valančiūnas (12)
| Ja Morant (5)
| FedEx Forum1,994
| 13–13
|-style="background:#fcc;"
| 27
| February 22
| @ Dallas
| 
| Ja Morant (22)
| Jonas Valančiūnas (15)
| Ja Morant (9)
| American Airlines Center2,099
| 13–14
|-style="background:#cfc;"
| 28
| February 25
| L. A. Clippers
| 
| Tyus Jones (20)
| Jonas Valančiūnas (15)
| Ja Morant (7)
| FedEx Forum1,896
| 14–14
|-style="background:#fcc;"
| 29
| February 26
| L. A. Clippers
| 
| Jonas Valančiūnas (22)
| Jonas Valančiūnas (11)
| Ja Morant (5)
| FedEx Forum2,039
| 14–15
|-style="background:#cfc;"
| 30
| February 28
| @ Houston
| 
| Justise Winslow (20)
| Brandon Clarke (12)
| Ja Morant (7)
| Toyota Center3,284
| 15–15

|-style="background:#cfc;"
| 31
| March 2
| @ Washington
| 
| Ja Morant (35)
| Jonas Valančiūnas (16)
| Ja Morant (10)
| Capital One Arena0
| 16–15
|-style="background:#fcc;"
| 32
| March 4
| Milwaukee
| 
| Ja Morant (35)
| Jonas Valančiūnas (12)
| Dillon Brooks (7)
| FedEx Forum1,961
| 16–16
|-style="background:#cfc;"
| 33
| March 10
| Washington
| 
| Jonas Valančiūnas (29)
| Jonas Valančiūnas (20)
| Ja Morant (10)
| FedEx Forum1,912
| 17–16
|-style="background:#fcc;"
| 34
| March 12
| Denver
| 
| Brooks, Clarke (20)
| Jonas Valančiūnas (11)
| Ja Morant (9)
| FedEx Forum2,160
| 17–17
|-style="background:#fcc;"
| 35
| March 14
| @ Oklahoma City
| 
| Ja Morant (22)
| Jonas Valančiūnas (14)
| Ja Morant (7)
| Chesapeake Energy Arena0
| 17–18
|-style="background:#fcc;"
| 36
| March 15
| @ Phoenix
| 
| Jonas Valančiūnas (24)
| Jonas Valančiūnas (17)
| Ja Morant (4)
| Phoenix Suns Arena3,188
| 17–19
|-style="background:#cfc;"
| 37
| March 17
| Miami
| 
| Anderson, Melton, Morant (13)
| Jonas Valančiūnas (12)
| Melton, Morant (6)
| FedEx Forum2,217
| 18–19
|-style="background:#fcc;"
| 38
| March 19
| Golden State
| 
| Allen, Morant (14)
| Jonas Valančiūnas (16)
| Tyus Jones (7)
| FedEx Forum2,716
| 18–20
|-style="background:#cfc;"
| 39
| March 20
| Golden State
| 
| Brooks, Valančiūnas (19)
| Jonas Valančiūnas (15)
| Ja Morant (8)
| FedEx Forum0
| 19–20
|-style="background:#cfc;"
| 40
| March 22
| Boston
| 
| Ja Morant (29)
| Jonas Valančiūnas (19)
| Ja Morant (9)
| FedExForum2,319
| 20–20
|-style="background:#cfc;"
| 41
| March 24
| @ Oklahoma City
| 
| Dillon Brooks (25)
| Jonas Valančiūnas (15)
| Ja Morant (7)
| Chesapeake Energy Arena0
| 21–20
|-style="background:#fcc;"
| 42
| March 26
| @ Utah
| 
| Ja Morant (32)
| Jonas Valančiūnas (18)
| Ja Morant (11)
| Vivint Arena5,546
| 21–21
|-style="background:#fcc;"
| 43
| March 27
| @ Utah
| 
| Kyle Anderson (16)
| Jonas Valančiūnas (11)
| Anderson, Morant (4)
| Vivint Arena5,546
| 21–22
|-style="background:#cfc;"
| 44
| March 29
| @ Houston
| 
| Jonas Valančiūnas (30)
| Jonas Valančiūnas (15)
| Ja Morant (8)
| Toyota Center3,319
| 22–22
|-style="background:#fcc;"
| 45
| March 31
| Utah
| 
| Ja Morant (36)
| Jonas Valančiūnas (14)
| Ja Morant (7)
| FedEx Forum2,314
| 22–23

|-style="background:#cfc;"
| 46
| April 2
| Minnesota
| 
| Jonas Valančiūnas (19)
| Jonas Valančiūnas (11)
| Anderson, Morant (7)
| FedEx Forum2,987
| 23–23
|-style="background:#cfc;"
| 47
| April 4
| @ Philadelphia
| 
| Dillon Brooks (17)
| Jonas Valančiūnas (12)
| Ja Morant (10)
| Wells Fargo Center4,094
| 24–23
|-style="background:#cfc;"
| 48
| April 6
| @ Miami
| 
| Dillon Brooks (28)
| Jonas Valančiūnas (10)
| Anderson, Konchar (6)
| American Airlines ArenaLimited seating
| 25–23
|-style="background:#cfc;"
| 49
| April 7
| @ Atlanta
| 
| Grayson Allen (30)
| Jonas Valančiūnas (11)
| Ja Morant (7)
| State Farm Arena2,774
| 26–23
|-style="background:#fcc;"
| 50
| April 9
| @ New York
| 
| Dillon Brooks (23)
| Jonas Valančiūnas (14)
| Ja Morant (6)
| Madison Square Garden1,912
| 26–24
|-style="background:#fcc;"
| 51
| April 11
| Indiana
| 
| Jonas Valančiūnas (34)
| Jonas Valančiūnas (22)
| Ja Morant (6)
| FedEx Forum2,341
| 26–25
|-style="background:#cfc;"
| 52
| April 12
| Chicago
| 
| Jonas Valančiūnas (26)
| Jonas Valančiūnas (14)
| Ja Morant (10)
| FedEx Forum2,194
| 27–25
|-style="background:#fcc;"
| 53
| April 14
| Dallas
| 
| Grayson Allen (23)
| Jonas Valančiūnas (16)
| Bane, Jones, Morant (5)
| FedEx Forum2,141
| 27–26
|-style="background:#cfc;"
| 54
| April 16
| @ Chicago
| 
| Dillon Brooks (32)
| Kyle Anderson (11)
| Anderson, Jones (7)
| United Center0
| 28–26
|-style="background:#cfc;"
| 55
| April 17
| @ Milwaukee
| 
| Grayson Allen (26)
| Anderson, Valančiūnas (8)
| Kyle Anderson (8)
| Fiserv Forum3,280
| 29–26
|-style="background:#fcc;"
| 56
| April 19
| @ Denver
| 
| Ja Morant (36)
| Xavier Tillman (14)
| Ja Morant (12)
| Ball Arena4,005
| 29–27
|-style="background:#fcc;"
| 57
| April 21
| @ L. A. Clippers
| 
| Ja Morant (22)
| Xavier Tillman (12)
| Ja Morant (4)
| Staples Center1,782
| 29–28
|-style="background:#cfc;"
| 58
| April 23
| @ Portland
| 
| Ja Morant (33)
| Kyle Anderson (8)
| Ja Morant (13)
| Moda Center0
| 30–28
|-style="background:#cfc;"
| 59
| April 25
| @ Portland
| 
| Ja Morant (28)
| Jonas Valančiūnas (10)
| Desmond Bane (4)
| Moda Center0
| 31–28
|-style="background:#fcc;"
| 60
| April 26
| @ Denver
| 
| Ja Morant (27)
| Anderson, Jackson Jr. (7)
| Ja Morant (6)
| Ball Arena3,823
| 31–29
|-style="background:#fcc;"
| 61
| April 28
| Portland
| 
| Jonas Valančiūnas (19)
| Brandon Clarke (10)
| Ja Morant (8)
| FedEx Forum3,427
| 31–30
|-style="background:#cfc;"
| 62
| April 30
| Orlando
| 
| Dillon Brooks (20)
| Jonas Valančiūnas (15)
| Ja Morant (6)
| FedEx Forum2,850
| 32–30

|-style="background:#fcc;"
| 63
| May 1
| @ Orlando
| 
| Dillon Brooks (23)
| Jonas Valančiūnas (16)
| Ja Morant (7)
| Amway Center3,924
| 32–31
|-style="background:#fcc;"
| 64
| May 3
| New York
| 
| Dillon Brooks (25)
| Jonas Valančiūnas (16)
| Kyle Anderson (7)
| FedExForum2,789
| 32–32
|-style="background:#cfc;"
| 65
| May 5
| @ Minnesota
| 
| Ja Morant (37)
| Brandon Clarke (10)
| Ja Morant (10)
| Target Center1,436
| 33–32
|-style="background:#fcc;"
| 66
| May 6
| @ Detroit
| 
| Ja Morant (20)
| Jonas Valančiūnas (16)
| Anderson, Morant (5)
| Little Caesars Arena750
| 33–33
|-style="background:#cfc;"
| 67
| May 8
| @ Toronto
| 
| Jaren Jackson Jr. (20)
| Jonas Valančiūnas (21)
| Ja Morant (6)
| Amalie ArenaLimited seating
| 34–33
|-style="background:#cfc;"
| 68
| May 10
| New Orleans
| 
| Dillon Brooks (23)
| Jonas Valančiūnas (11)
| Ja Morant (12)
| FedExForum2,507
| 35–33
|-style="background:#cfc;"
| 69
| May 11
| Dallas
| 
| Ja Morant (24)
| Brandon Clarke (9)
| Ja Morant (8)
| FedExForum2,684
| 36–33
|-style="background:#cfc;"
| 70
| May 13
| Sacramento
| 
| Dillon Brooks (31)
| Jonas Valančiūnas (13)
| Kyle Anderson (9)
| FedExForum2,876
| 37–33
|-style="background:#cfc;"
| 71
| May 14
| Sacramento
| 
| Justise Winslow (25)
| Justise Winslow (11)
| Justise Winslow (13)
| FedExForum3,502
| 38–33
|-style="background:#fcc;"
| 72
| May 16
| @ Golden State
| 
| Jonas Valančiūnas (29)
| Jonas Valančiūnas (16)
| Ja Morant (9)
| Chase Center4,416
| 38–34

Play-in 

|-style="background:#cfc;"
| 1
| May 19
| San Antonio
| 
| Dillon Brooks (24)
| Jonas Valančiūnas (23)
| Ja Morant (6)
| FedExForum7,019
| 1–0
|-style="background:#cfc;"
| 2
| May 21
| @ Golden State
| 
| Ja Morant (35)
| Jonas Valančiūnas (12)
| Anderson, Morant (6)
| Chase Center7,505
| 2–0

Playoffs 

|-style="background:#cfc;"
| 1
| May 23
| @ Utah
| 
| Dillon Brooks (31)
| Jonas Valančiūnas (12)
| Ja Morant (4)
| Vivint Arena13,750
| 1–0
|-style="background:#fcc;"
| 2
| May 26
| @ Utah
| 
| Ja Morant (47)
| Anderson, Valančiūnas (6)
| Ja Morant (7)
| Vivint Arena14,200
| 1–1
|-style="background:#fcc;"
| 3
| May 29
| Utah
| 
| Ja Morant (28)
| Anderson, Valančiūnas (13)
| Ja Morant (7)
| FedExForum12,185
| 1–2
|-style="background:#fcc;"
| 4
| May 31
| Utah
| 
| Ja Morant (23)
| Jonas Valančiūnas (12)
| Ja Morant (12)
| FedExForum12,185
| 1–3
|-style="background:#fcc;"
| 5
| June 2
| @ Utah
| 
| Brooks, Morant (27)
| Jackson Jr., Morant (7)
| Ja Morant (11)
| Vivint Arena14,250
| 1–4

Transactions

Trades

Free agency

Additions

Subtractions

Awards and records

Notes

References

Memphis Grizzlies
Memphis Grizzlies seasons
Memphis Grizzlies
Memphis Grizzlies
Events in Memphis, Tennessee